The 1974 Pittsburgh Pirates season was the 93rd season of the Pittsburgh Pirates franchise; the 88th in the National League. The Pirates finished first in the National League East with a record of 88–74. The Pirates were defeated three games to one by the Los Angeles Dodgers in the 1974 National League Championship Series.

Offseason 
 October 18, 1973: Ken Brett was traded to the Pirates by the Philadelphia Phillies for Dave Cash.
 October 18, 1973: Jerry Reuss was traded to the Pirates by the Houston Astros for Milt May.
 December 4, 1973: Nelson Briles and Fernando Gonzalez were traded by the Pirates to the Kansas City Royals for Ed Kirkpatrick and Kurt Bevacqua.
 December 5, 1973: Luke Walker was sold by the Pirates to the Detroit Tigers.
 December 7, 1973: Bob Johnson was traded by the Pirates to the Cleveland Indians for Burnel Flowers (minors).
 January 9, 1974: Fred Breining was drafted by the Pirates in the 3rd round of the 1974 Major League Baseball draft.
 January 16, 1974: John Lamb was purchased from the Pirates by the Chicago White Sox.
 January 31, 1974: Jackie Hernández was traded by the Pirates to the Philadelphia Phillies for Mike Ryan.
 March 14, 1974: Silvio Martínez was signed as an amateur free agent by the Pirates.
 March 27, 1974: John Lamb was purchased by the Pirates from the Chicago White Sox.
 April 1, 1974: Tom Dettore was traded by the Pirates to the Chicago Cubs for Paul Popovich.

Regular season

Season standings

Record vs. opponents

Game log

|- bgcolor="ffbbbb"
| 1 || April 5 || @ Cardinals || 5–6 (10) || Hrabosky || Giusti (0–1) || — || 24,210 || 0–1
|- bgcolor="ffbbbb"
| 2 || April 6 || @ Cardinals || 0–8 || Siebert || Moose (0–1) || — || 17,875 || 0–2
|- bgcolor="ffbbbb"
| 3 || April 10 || Expos || 8–12 (13) || Taylor || Hernández (0–1) || — || 40,434 || 0–3
|- bgcolor="ffbbbb"
| 4 || April 11 || Expos || 1–5 || Rogers || Ellis (0–1) || — || 5,606 || 0–4
|- bgcolor="ffbbbb"
| 5 || April 12 || Cardinals || 6–7 (11) || Garman || Kison (0–1) || Folkers || 9,524 || 0–5
|- bgcolor="ffbbbb"
| 6 || April 13 || Cardinals || 4–6 || McGlothen || Rooker (0–1) || Richert || 7,026 || 0–6
|- bgcolor="ccffcc"
| 7 || April 14 || Cardinals || 8–4 || Moose (1–1) || Thompson || — ||  || 1–6
|- bgcolor="ffbbbb"
| 8 || April 14 || Cardinals || 5–6 || Curtis || Brett (0–1) || Folkers || 11,949 || 1–7
|- bgcolor="ccffcc"
| 9 || April 16 || @ Cubs || 8–5 (12) || Kison (1–1) || Paul || — || 14,953 || 2–7
|- bgcolor="ffbbbb"
| 10 || April 17 || @ Cubs || 9–18 || Hooton || Reuss (0–1) || — || 15,560 || 2–8
|- bgcolor="ffbbbb"
| 11 || April 18 || @ Cubs || 0–1 || Frailing || Rooker (0–2) || Burris || 13,054 || 2–9
|- bgcolor="ffbbbb"
| 12 || April 20 || @ Mets || 2–5 || Koosman || Moose (1–2) || — || 18,070 || 2–10
|- bgcolor="ccffcc"
| 13 || April 21 || @ Mets || 7–0 || Brett (1–1) || Seaver || — || 23,375 || 3–10
|- bgcolor="ccffcc"
| 14 || April 24 || @ Braves || 5–3 || Ellis (1–1) || Niekro || Giusti (1) || 3,395 || 4–10
|- bgcolor="ffbbbb"
| 15 || April 25 || @ Braves || 2–3 || Reed || Reuss (0–2) || — || 3,437 || 4–11
|- bgcolor="ccffcc"
| 16 || April 26 || Astros || 4–3 || Giusti (1–1) || Scherman || — || 11,145 || 5–11
|- bgcolor="ffbbbb"
| 17 || April 27 || Astros || 7–10 || Griffin || Moose (1–3) || — || 6,835 || 5–12
|- bgcolor="ccffcc"
| 18 || April 28 || Astros || 7–3 || Brett (2–1) || Osteen || Giusti (2) || 13,073 || 6–12
|-

|- bgcolor="ffbbbb"
| 19 || May 1 || Reds || 3–5 || Carroll || Morlan (0–1) || Borbon || 8,195 || 6–13
|- bgcolor="ccffcc"
| 20 || May 3 || Braves || 4–2 || Reuss (1–2) || Harrison || — || 11,248 || 7–13
|- bgcolor="ccffcc"
| 21 || May 4 || Braves || 4–3 || Rooker (1–2) || Niekro || — || 8,069 || 8–13
|- bgcolor="ffbbbb"
| 22 || May 5 || Braves || 2–3 || Reed || Brett (2–2) || House || 13,596 || 8–14
|- bgcolor="ffbbbb"
| 23 || May 7 || @ Astros || 1–2 || Griffin || Ellis (1–2) || — || 9,909 || 8–15
|- bgcolor="ffbbbb"
| 24 || May 8 || @ Astros || 6–8 (12) || Nagy || Sadowski (0–1) || — || 11,266 || 8–16
|- bgcolor="ccffcc"
| 25 || May 9 || @ Astros || 4–1 || Rooker (2–2) || Roberts || — || 10,864 || 9–16
|- bgcolor="ffbbbb"
| 26 || May 10 || @ Phillies || 2–3 || Ruthven || Brett (2–3) || Scarce || 16,388 || 9–17
|- bgcolor="ffbbbb"
| 27 || May 11 || @ Phillies || 1–3 || Carlton || Moose (1–4) || — || 21,070 || 9–18
|- bgcolor="ffbbbb"
| 28 || May 12 || @ Phillies || 7–8 || Farmer || Ellis (1–3) || Watt || 11,243 || 9–19
|- bgcolor="ffbbbb"
| 29 || May 14 || Cubs || 1–7 || Reuschel || Reuss (1–3) || — || 6,541 || 9–20
|- bgcolor="ccffcc"
| 30 || May 15 || Cubs || 3–2 (14) || Kison (2–1) || Bonham || — || 6,873 || 10–20
|- bgcolor="ccffcc"
| 31 || May 16 || Cubs || 5–2 || Brett (3–3) || Frailing || Kison (1) || 5,845 || 11–20
|- bgcolor="ffbbbb"
| 32 || May 18 || Phillies || 2–9 || Schueler || Moose (1–5) || — || 8,021 || 11–21
|- bgcolor="ffbbbb"
| 33 || May 19 || Phillies || 2–3 || Lonborg || Ellis (1–4) || Watt ||  || 11–22
|- bgcolor="ccffcc"
| 34 || May 19 || Phillies || 2–1 || Reuss (2–3) || Ruthven || — || 13,426 || 12–22
|- bgcolor="ffbbbb"
| 35 || May 20 || @ Expos || 2–4 || Torrez || Rooker (2–3) || Taylor || 12,228 || 12–23
|- bgcolor="ccffcc"
| 36 || May 21 || @ Expos || 8–4 || Brett (4–3) || Moore || — || 9,231 || 13–23
|- bgcolor="ffbbbb"
| 37 || May 23 || @ Expos || 4–5 || Rogers || Kison (2–2) || Taylor || 7,209 || 13–24
|- bgcolor="ccffcc"
| 38 || May 24 || Mets || 4–1 || Reuss (3–3) || Matlack || — || 12,257 || 14–24
|- bgcolor="ffbbbb"
| 39 || May 25 || Mets || 3–4 || Koosman || Ellis (1–5) || — || 11,260 || 14–25
|- bgcolor="ffbbbb"
| 40 || May 26 || Mets || 3–5 || Sadecki || Giusti (1–2) || Parker || 15,573 || 14–26
|- bgcolor="ccffcc"
| 41 || May 27 || Padres || 6–0 || Brett (5–3) || Jones || — ||  || 15–26
|- bgcolor="ccffcc"
| 42 || May 27 || Padres || 8–7 || Tekulve (1–0) || McAndrew || — || 15,367 || 16–26
|- bgcolor="ccffcc"
| 43 || May 29 || Padres || 13–3 || Reuss (4–3) || Hardy || — || 4,534 || 17–26
|- bgcolor="ffbbbb"
| 44 || May 31 || @ Reds || 5–7 || Borbon || Rooker (2–4) || — || 40,205 || 17–27
|-

|- bgcolor="ccffcc"
| 45 || June 1 || @ Reds || 14–1 || Brett (6–3) || Nelson || — || 36,999 || 18–27
|- bgcolor="ffbbbb"
| 46 || June 2 || @ Reds || 1–5 || Norman || Kison (2–3) || — || 38,354 || 18–28
|- bgcolor="ffbbbb"
| 47 || June 4 || @ Dodgers || 0–5 || John || Reuss (4–4) || — || 23,472 || 18–29
|- bgcolor="ffbbbb"
| 48 || June 5 || @ Dodgers || 2–3 || Marshall || Rooker (2–5) || — || 25,959 || 18–30
|- bgcolor="ffbbbb"
| 49 || June 6 || @ Dodgers || 0–6 || Messersmith || Brett (6–4) || — || 26,717 || 18–31
|- bgcolor="ffbbbb"
| 50 || June 7 || @ Giants || 2–6 || D'Acquisto || Demery (0–1) || — || 3,845 || 18–32
|- bgcolor="ccffcc"
| 51 || June 8 || @ Giants || 5–2 || Ellis (2–5) || Bradley || Kison (2) || 9,138 || 19–32
|- bgcolor="ccffcc"
| 52 || June 9 || @ Giants || 14–1 || Reuss (5–4) || Bryant || — || 8,786 || 20–32
|- bgcolor="ffbbbb"
| 53 || June 10 || @ Padres || 8–9 || Romo || Tekulve (1–1) || — || 7,309 || 20–33
|- bgcolor="ccffcc"
| 54 || June 11 || @ Padres || 5–2 || Brett (7–4) || Jones || — || 9,505 || 21–33
|- bgcolor="ffbbbb"
| 55 || June 12 || @ Padres || 2–5 || Freisleben || Demery (0–2) || Tomlin || 12,336 || 21–34
|- bgcolor="ccffcc"
| 56 || June 14 || Giants || 4–2 || Ellis (3–5) || Bryant || — || 18,588 || 22–34
|- bgcolor="ccffcc"
| 57 || June 15 || Giants || 3–2 (9) || Patterson (1–0) || Sosa || — || 13,571 || 23–34
|- bgcolor="ccffcc"
| 58 || June 16 || Giants || 4–3 || Rooker (3–5) || Bradley || — || 12,606 || 24–34
|- bgcolor="ccffcc"
| 59 || June 17 || Dodgers || 7–3 || Brett (8–4) || Sutton || — || 17,105 || 25–34
|- bgcolor="ccffcc"
| 60 || June 18 || Dodgers || 2–0 || Giusti (2–2) || John || Patterson (1) || 15,054 || 26–34
|- bgcolor="ccffcc"
| 61 || June 19 || Dodgers || 7–3 || Reuss (6–4) || Rau || — || 16,493 || 27–34
|- bgcolor="ffbbbb"
| 62 || June 20 || @ Cubs || 0–3 || Reuschel || Ellis (3–6) || — || 12,321 || 27–35
|- bgcolor="ffbbbb"
| 63 || June 21 || @ Cubs || 2–3 || Stone || Rooker (3–6) || Zamora || 11,625 || 27–36
|- bgcolor="ccffcc"
| 64 || June 22 || @ Cubs || 6–0 || Brett (9–4) || Frailing || — || 10,069 || 28–36
|- bgcolor="ffbbbb"
| 65 || June 23 || @ Cubs || 3–7 || Bonham || Giusti (2–3) || — || 24,855 || 28–37
|- bgcolor="ffbbbb"
| 66 || June 24 || @ Cardinals || 1–3 || Foster || Reuss (6–5) || Garman ||  || 28–38
|- bgcolor="ffbbbb"
| 67 || June 24 || @ Cardinals || 0–4 || Gibson || Demery (0–3) || — || 25,093 || 28–39
|- bgcolor="ffbbbb"
| 68 || June 25 || @ Cardinals || 7–8 || Hrabosky || Patterson (1–1) || Curtis || 17,392 || 28–40
|- bgcolor="ccffcc"
| 69 || June 26 || @ Cardinals || 7–2 || Rooker (4–6) || Siebert || — || 18,487 || 29–40
|- bgcolor="ccffcc"
| 70 || June 29 || Phillies || 6–3 || Reuss (7–5) || Lonborg || — || 15,839 || 30–40
|- bgcolor="ccffcc"
| 71 || June 30 || Phillies || 11–8 || Brett (10–4) || Carlton || — ||  || 31–40
|- bgcolor="ccffcc"
| 72 || June 30 || Phillies || 3–2 || Kison (3–3) || Schueler || — || 25,730 || 32–40
|-

|- bgcolor="ccffcc"
| 73 || July 2 || Expos || 4–2 || Rooker (5–6) || Montague || — || 13,138 || 33–40
|- bgcolor="ccffcc"
| 74 || July 3 || Expos || 2–1 || Reuss (8–5) || Montague || — || 11,123 || 34–40
|- bgcolor="ffbbbb"
| 75 || July 4 || Expos || 1–2 || Rogers || Brett (10–5) || — ||  || 34–41
|- bgcolor="ccffcc"
| 76 || July 4 || Expos || 3–2 || Kison (4–3) || Blair || — || 22,456 || 35–41
|- bgcolor="ffbbbb"
| 77 || July 5 || @ Astros || 1–7 || Dierker || Ellis (3–7) || — || 23,047 || 35–42
|- bgcolor="ffbbbb"
| 78 || July 6 || @ Astros || 0–1 || Wilson || Kison (4–4) || — || 29,640 || 35–43
|- bgcolor="ccffcc"
| 79 || July 7 || @ Astros || 6–4 (10) || Giusti (3–3) || Scherman || — || 18,984 || 36–43
|- bgcolor="ffbbbb"
| 80 || July 8 || Braves || 0–5 || Leon || Reuss (8–6) || — || 11,494 || 36–44
|- bgcolor="ccffcc"
| 81 || July 9 || Braves || 5–4 || Brett (11–5) || Niekro || Giusti (3) || 13,737 || 37–44
|- bgcolor="ffbbbb"
| 82 || July 10 || Braves || 5–10 || Morton || Ellis (3–8) || — || 13,922 || 37–45
|- bgcolor="ffbbbb"
| 83 || July 12 || Reds || 0–7 || Gullett || Rooker (5–7) || — ||  || 37–46
|- bgcolor="ffbbbb"
| 84 || July 12 || Reds || 3–4 || Carroll || Demery (0–4) || Carroll || 30,507 || 37–47
|- bgcolor="ffbbbb"
| 85 || July 13 || Reds || 4–9 || Hall || Reuss (8–7) || Borbon || 15,386 || 37–48
|- bgcolor="ffbbbb"
| 86 || July 14 || Reds || 2–3 || Norman || Brett (11–6) || Carroll ||  || 37–49
|- bgcolor="ccffcc"
| 87 || July 14 || Reds || 2–1 || Kison (5–4) || Billingham || Giusti (4) || 27,151 || 38–49
|- bgcolor="ccffcc"
| 88 || July 15 || Astros || 3–1 || Ellis (4–8) || Roberts || — || 9,171 || 39–49
|- bgcolor="ccffcc"
| 89 || July 16 || Astros || 6–2 || Rooker (6–7) || Dierker || — || 9,935 || 40–49
|- bgcolor="ccffcc"
| 90 || July 17 || Astros || 11–3 || Demery (1–4) || Wilson || — || 10,941 || 41–49
|- bgcolor="ccffcc"
| 91 || July 18 || @ Braves || 4–0 || Reuss (9–7) || Reed || — || 8,262 || 42–49
|- bgcolor="ccffcc"
| 92 || July 19 || @ Braves || 2–0 || Brett (12–6) || Niekro || Giusti (5) || 9,583 || 43–49
|- bgcolor="ccffcc"
| 93 || July 20 || @ Braves || 7–6 (11) || Giusti (4–3) || Frisella || — || 40,225 || 44–49
|- bgcolor="ccffcc"
| 94 || July 21 || @ Braves || 6–2 || Ellis (5–8) || Capra || — || 9,351 || 45–49
|- bgcolor="ffbbbb"
| 95 || July 25 || @ Expos || 5–10 || Renko || Rooker (6–8) || — ||  || 45–50
|- bgcolor="ccffcc"
| 96 || July 25 || @ Expos || 3–2 || Reuss (10–7) || Rogers || Giusti (6) || 27,283 || 46–50
|- bgcolor="ccffcc"
| 97 || July 26 || @ Expos || 3–0 || Ellis (6–8) || Blair || Hernández (1) || 22,278 || 47–50
|- bgcolor="ffbbbb"
| 98 || July 27 || @ Phillies || 5–6 || Richert || Brett (12–7) || — ||  || 47–51
|- bgcolor="ffbbbb"
| 99 || July 27 || @ Phillies || 4–7 || Twitchell || Kison (5–5) || Watt || 55,066 || 47–52
|- bgcolor="ccffcc"
| 100 || July 28 || @ Phillies || 4–3 || Giusti (5–3) || Scarce || — || 34,049 || 48–52
|- bgcolor="ffbbbb"
| 101 || July 29 || @ Phillies || 1–13 || Carlton || Reuss (10–8) || — || 27,760 || 48–53
|- bgcolor="ccffcc"
| 102 || July 30 || @ Mets || 6–0 || Rooker (7–8) || Matlack || — ||  || 49–53
|- bgcolor="ffbbbb"
| 103 || July 30 || @ Mets || 3–4 || Koosman || Kison (5–6) || — || 39,246 || 49–54
|- bgcolor="ccffcc"
| 104 || July 31 || @ Mets || 8–3 || Ellis (7–8) || Seaver || — || 23,281 || 50–54
|-

|- bgcolor="ffbbbb"
| 105 || August 1 || Cardinals || 2–5 (11) || Folkers || Giusti (5–4) || — || 17,318 || 50–55
|- bgcolor="ccffcc"
| 106 || August 2 || Cardinals || 3–2 (14) || Hernández (1–1) || Pena || — || 19,385 || 51–55
|- bgcolor="ffbbbb"
| 107 || August 3 || Cubs || 3–4 || Reuschel || Reuss (10–9) || LaRoche || 9,316 || 51–56
|- bgcolor="ffbbbb"
| 108 || August 4 || Cubs || 3–4 || Bonham || Rooker (7–9) || — ||  || 51–57
|- bgcolor="ccffcc"
| 109 || August 4 || Cubs || 7–1 || Kison (6–6) || Hutson || — || 23,536 || 52–57
|- bgcolor="ccffcc"
| 110 || August 6 || Mets || 9–8 (11) || Patterson (2–1) || McGraw || — || 12,441 || 53–57
|- bgcolor="ccffcc"
| 111 || August 7 || Mets || 10–1 || Demery (2–4) || Parker || — || 13,360 || 54–57
|- bgcolor="ccffcc"
| 112 || August 8 || Mets || 4–3 || Reuss (11–9) || Matlack || — || 11,191 || 55–57
|- bgcolor="ccffcc"
| 113 || August 9 || Padres || 7–3 || Rooker (8–9) || Jones || — || 11,507 || 56–57
|- bgcolor="ffbbbb"
| 114 || August 10 || Padres || 4–8 || Freisleben || Morlan (0–2) || — || 15,150 || 56–58
|- bgcolor="ccffcc"
| 115 || August 11 || Padres || 8–1 || Ellis (8–8) || Spillner || — || 14,726 || 57–58
|- bgcolor="ccffcc"
| 116 || August 12 || @ Reds || 7–4 || Reuss (12–9) || Kirby || Giusti (7) || 30,327 || 58–58
|- bgcolor="ccffcc"
| 117 || August 13 || @ Reds || 14–3 || Demery (3–4) || Billingham || — || 32,280 || 59–58
|- bgcolor="ffbbbb"
| 118 || August 14 || @ Reds || 2–3 (10) || Carroll || Kison (6–7) || — || 30,018 || 59–59
|- bgcolor="ccffcc"
| 119 || August 16 || Dodgers || 5–2 || Ellis (9–8) || Sutton || — || 32,347 || 60–59
|- bgcolor="ccffcc"
| 120 || August 17 || Dodgers || 4–3 || Reuss (13–9) || Messersmith || Giusti (8) || 18,681 || 61–59
|- bgcolor="ccffcc"
| 121 || August 18 || Dodgers || 10–3 || Demery (4–4) || Zahn || — || 33,225 || 62–59
|- bgcolor="ffbbbb"
| 122 || August 19 || Giants || 3–5 || Bryant || Rooker (8–10) || Sosa || 14,077 || 62–60
|- bgcolor="ffbbbb"
| 123 || August 20 || Giants || 7–8 (10) || Caldwell || Morlan (0–3) || — || 15,944 || 62–61
|- bgcolor="ccffcc"
| 124 || August 21 || Giants || 4–2 || Ellis (10–8) || Halicki || — || 19,814 || 63–61
|- bgcolor="ccffcc"
| 125 || August 23 || @ Padres || 6–2 || Reuss (14–9) || Greif || — || 13,443 || 64–61
|- bgcolor="ccffcc"
| 126 || August 25 || @ Padres || 4–1 (12) || Rooker (9–10) || Palmer || — ||  || 65–61
|- bgcolor="ccffcc"
| 127 || August 25 || @ Padres || 10–2 || Demery (5–4) || Freisleben || — || 11,567 || 66–61
|- bgcolor="ccffcc"
| 128 || August 27 || @ Giants || 13–2 || Ellis (11–8) || D'Acquisto || — || 3,273 || 67–61
|- bgcolor="ccffcc"
| 129 || August 28 || @ Giants || 3–1 (11) || Giusti (6–4) || Barr || — || 3,679 || 68–61
|- bgcolor="ffbbbb"
| 130 || August 29 || @ Giants || 2–3 (11) || Moffitt || Giusti (6–5) || — || 3,172 || 68–62
|- bgcolor="ccffcc"
| 131 || August 30 || @ Dodgers || 4–3 || Rooker (10–10) || Marshall || Giusti (9) || 38,887 || 69–62
|- bgcolor="ccffcc"
| 132 || August 31 || @ Dodgers || 4–3 || Demery (6–4) || Zahn || Giusti (10) || 41,653 || 70–62
|-

|- bgcolor="ffbbbb"
| 133 || September 1 || @ Dodgers || 2–6 || Sutton || Ellis (11–9) || — || 29,667 || 70–63
|- bgcolor="ccffcc"
| 134 || September 2 || Phillies || 7–4 || Reuss (15–9) || Carlton || — ||  || 71–63
|- bgcolor="ccffcc"
| 135 || September 2 || Phillies || 11–1 || Kison (7–7) || Schueler || — || 45,181 || 72–63
|- bgcolor="ccffcc"
| 136 || September 3 || Phillies || 8–2 || Rooker (11–10) || Twitchell || — || 8,168 || 73–63
|- bgcolor="ccffcc"
| 137 || September 6 || Expos || 2–1 || Ellis (12–9) || Renko || — || 15,386 || 74–63
|- bgcolor="ccffcc"
| 138 || September 7 || Expos || 6–5 (12) || Hernández (2–1) || Murray || — || 17,576 || 75–63
|- bgcolor="ccffcc"
| 139 || September 8 || Expos || 8–2 || Rooker (12–10) || Rogers || — || 18,870 || 76–63
|- bgcolor="ffbbbb"
| 140 || September 9 || @ Cubs || 4–9 || Stone || Demery (6–5) || LaRoche || 2,918 || 76–64
|- bgcolor="ccffcc"
| 141 || September 10 || @ Cubs || 12–4 || Brett (13–7) || Reuschel || — || 4,843 || 77–64
|- bgcolor="ffbbbb"
| 142 || September 11 || @ Phillies || 5–8 || Schueler || Hernández (2–2) || — || 21,117 || 77–65
|- bgcolor="ffbbbb"
| 143 || September 12 || @ Phillies || 4–6 || Garber || Kison (7–8) || — || 22,135 || 77–66
|- bgcolor="ffbbbb"
| 144 || September 13 || @ Expos || 2–3 || Rogers || Rooker (12–11) || — || 9,283 || 77–67
|- bgcolor="ffbbbb"
| 145 || September 14 || @ Expos || 2–17 || Blair || Demery (6–6) || — || 15,566 || 77–68
|- bgcolor="ffbbbb"
| 146 || September 15 || @ Expos || 4–5 || Renko || Brett (13–8) || Murray || 15,438 || 77–69
|- bgcolor="ffbbbb"
| 147 || September 17 || Cardinals || 1–2 (13) || Hrabosky || Reuss (15–10) || — || 21,458 || 77–70
|- bgcolor="ccffcc"
| 148 || September 18 || Cardinals || 4–1 || Rooker (13–11) || McGlothen || — || 18,126 || 78–70
|- bgcolor="ccffcc"
| 149 || September 19 || Cardinals || 8–6 || Hernández (3–2) || Folkers || Giusti (11) || 19,844 || 79–70
|- bgcolor="ccffcc"
| 150 || September 20 || Mets || 4–3 || Hernández (4–2) || McGraw || — || 11,683 || 80–70
|- bgcolor="ffbbbb"
| 151 || September 21 || Mets || 2–4 || Koosman || Pizarro (0–1) || — || 7,160 || 80–71
|- bgcolor="ffbbbb"
| 152 || September 22 || Mets || 0–4 || Matlack || Reuss (15–11) || — || 27,915 || 80–72
|- bgcolor="ccffcc"
| 153 || September 23 || @ Cardinals || 1–0 (10) || Rooker (14–11) || McGlothen || Giusti (12) || 33,525 || 81–72
|- bgcolor="ccffcc"
| 154 || September 24 || @ Cardinals || 7–3 || Kison (8–8) || Curtis || — || 37,197 || 82–72
|- bgcolor="ffbbbb"
| 155 || September 25 || @ Cardinals || 12–13 (11) || Garman || Minshall (0–1) || — || 41,345 || 82–73
|- bgcolor="ccffcc"
| 156 || September 26 || @ Mets || 11–5 || Pizarro (1–1) || Koosman || — || 9,250 || 83–73
|- bgcolor="ccffcc"
| 157 || September 27 || @ Mets || 2–1 || Reuss (16–11) || Matlack || — || 17,440 || 84–73
|- bgcolor="ccffcc"
| 158 || September 28 || @ Mets || 7–3 || Rooker (15–11) || McGraw || Hernández (2) || 13,059 || 85–73
|- bgcolor="ffbbbb"
| 159 || September 29 || @ Mets || 2–7 || Apodaca || Brett (13–9) || — || 50,653 || 85–74
|- bgcolor="ccffcc"
| 160 || September 30 || Cubs || 2–1 || Kison (9–8) || Bonham || — || 10,482 || 86–74
|-

|- bgcolor="ccffcc"
| 161 || October 1 || Cubs || 6–5 || Giusti (7–5) || LaRoche || — || 13,801 || 87–74
|- bgcolor="ccffcc"
| 162 || October 2 || Cubs || 5–4 (10) || Hernández (5–2) || Frailing || — || 22,725 || 88–74
|-

|-
| Legend:       = Win       = LossBold = Pirates team member

Opening Day lineup

Notable transactions 
 April 20, 1974: Dal Maxvill was released by the Pirates.
 June 5, 1974: 1974 Major League Baseball draft
Rod Scurry was drafted by the Pirates in the 1st round of the 1974 Major League Baseball draft.
Ed Whitson was drafted by the Pirates in the 6th round of the 1974 Major League Baseball draft.
Mike Edwards was drafted by the Pirates in the 7th round of the 1974 Major League Baseball draft.
 July 8, 1974: Kurt Bevacqua was traded by the Pirates to the Kansas City Royals for Cal Meier (minors).
 July 11, 1974: Chuck Brinkman was purchased by the Pirates from the Chicago White Sox.
 August 20, 1974: Juan Pizarro was signed by the Pirates.

Roster

Player stats

Batting

Starters by position 
Note: Pos = Position; G = Games played; AB = At bats; H = Hits; Avg. = Batting average; HR = Home runs; RBI = Runs batted in

Other batters 
Note: G = Games played; AB = At bats; H = Hits; Avg. = Batting average; HR = Home runs; RBI = Runs batted in

Pitching

Starting pitchers 
Note: G = Games pitched; IP = Innings pitched; W = Wins; L = Losses; ERA = Earned run average; SO = Strikeouts

Other pitchers 
Note: G = Games pitched; IP = Innings pitched; W = Wins; L = Losses; ERA = Earned run average; SO = Strikeouts

Relief pitchers 
Note: G = Games pitched; W = Wins; L = Losses; SV = Saves; ERA = Earned run average; SO = Strikeouts

National League Championship Series

Awards and honors 
 Willie Stargell, Roberto Clemente Award
 Willie Stargell, Lou Gehrig Award
1974 Major League Baseball All-Star Game

Farm system 

LEAGUE CHAMPIONS: Thetford Mines, Salem

Notes

References 
 1974 Pittsburgh Pirates at Baseball Reference
 1974 Pittsburgh Pirates at Baseball Almanac

Pittsburgh Pirates seasons
Pittsburgh Pirates season
National League East champion seasons
Pittsburg